Gus A. Fleischli (born December 26, 1925) is an American former politician in the state of Wyoming. He served in the Wyoming House of Representatives as a member of the Republican Party.

Early life and career
Born in 1925, Fleischli attended Cheyenne High School and then the University of Wyoming. He abandoned his studies at the age of 17 in order to join the Army Air Corps, where he flew 32 missions over Germany as a gunner on B-17 Bombers during World War II. He later worked as a petroleum marketer and truck stop operator.

Political career
Fleischli served in the Wyoming House of Representatives as a member of the Republican Party. He resigned in 1977 during his third term in order to run, unsuccessfully, as governor.

Later life
In 2010, Fleischli was awarded an honorary doctorate in law from the University of Wyoming. In 2012, he was presented with an award for his community work including organizing a veterans' trip to Washington D.C.

References

1925 births
Living people
University of Wyoming alumni
Businesspeople from Wyoming
Republican Party members of the Wyoming House of Representatives
People from Rawlins, Wyoming